Dundalk, meaning "the fort of Dealgan", is the county town (the administrative centre) of County Louth, Ireland. The town is on the Castletown River, which flows into Dundalk Bay on the east coast of Ireland. It is halfway between Dublin and Belfast, close to the border with Northern Ireland. It is the eighth largest urban area in Ireland, with a population of 39,004 as of the 2016 census.

Having been inhabited since the Neolithic period, Dundalk was established as a Norman stronghold in the 12th century following the Norman invasion of Ireland, and became the northernmost outpost of The Pale in the Late Middle Ages. The town came to be nicknamed the "Gap of the North" where the northernmost point of the province of Leinster meets the province of Ulster. The modern street layout dates from the early 18th century and owes its form to James Hamilton (later 1st Earl of Clanbrassil). The legends of the mythical warrior hero Cú Chulainn are set in the district and the motto on the town's coat of arms is Mé do rug Cú Chulainn cróga(Irish) "I gave birth to brave Cú Chulainn".

The town developed brewing, distilling, tobacco, textile, and engineering industries during the nineteenth century. It became prosperous and its population grew as it became an important manufacturing and trading centre—both as a hub on the Great Northern Railway (Ireland) network and with its maritime link to Liverpool from the Port of Dundalk. It later suffered from high unemployment and urban decay after these industries closed or scaled back operations both in the aftermath of the Partition of Ireland in 1921 and following the accession of Ireland to the European Economic Community in 1973. New industries have been established in the early part of the 21st century, including pharmaceutical, technology, financial services, and specialist foods.

There is one third-level education institute—Dundalk Institute of Technology. The largest theatre in the town, An Táin Arts Centre (named after the legend of the same name), is housed in the Town Hall, and the restored buildings of the nearby former Dundalk Distillery house both the County Museum Dundalk and the Louth County Library. Sporting clubs include Dundalk Football Club (who play at Oriel Park), Dundalk Rugby Club, Dundalk Golf Club, and several clubs competing in Gaelic games. Dundalk Stadium is a horse and greyhound racing venue and is Ireland's only all-weather horse racing track.

History

Early history and legend

Archaeological studies at Rockmarshall indicate that the Dundalk area was first inhabited circa 3700 BC following the end of the last Ice Age, during the Neolithic period. Visible evidence of this early presence can be seen in the form of the Proleek Dolmen, a portal tomb in the Ballymascanlon area, north of Dundalk, which dates to around 3000 BC. A wedge-shaped gallery grave (known as the "Giant's Grave") is nearby. Other pre-Christian archaeological sites in the Dundalk Municipal District are Rockmarshall Court Tomb, a court cairn, and Aghnaskeagh Cairns, a chambered cairn and portal tomb.

The legends of Cú Chulainn, including the Táin Bó Cúailnge (The Cattle Raid of Cooley), an epic of early Irish literature, are set in the first century AD, before the arrival of Christianity to Ireland. Clochafarmore, the menhir that Cú Chulainn reputedly tied himself to before he died, is located to the west of the town, near Knockbridge.

According to the Annals of the Four Masters, a battle was fought at Faughart (a townland 6 km north of the centre of Dundalk, near the Moyry Pass) between Cormac mac Airt, High King of Ireland and Storno (or Starno), King of Lochlin, in 248. The story is folklore and both characters are ahistorical.

Evidence of settlements from early Christian Ireland are to be found in the high concentration of souterrains in north Louth. The high concentration of souterrains indicates that the area was regularly subject to raids, and the discovery of a type of pottery known as 'souterrain ware', which has only been found in north Louth, County Down and County Antrim, indicates that these areas shared cultural ties separate from the rest of early historic Ireland. The concentration of souterrains drops significantly on crossing the River Fane to the south, indicating that the district was a border area between separate kingdoms.

Saint Brigid is reputed to have been born in 451 AD in Faughart. A shrine to her is located at Faughart. St Brigid's Church in Kilcurry holds what worshippers believe is a relic of the saint—a fragment of her skull, which was brought to the church in 1905 by Sister Mary Agnes of the Dundalk Convent of Mercy.

Middle Ages
Most of what is recorded about the Dundalk area between the fifth century and the foundation of the town as a Norman stronghold in the 12th century comes from the Annals of the Four Masters and the Annals of Tigernach, which were both written hundreds of years after the events they record. According to the annals, the plains of North Louth incorporating what is now Dundalk were known as Magh Muirthemne (the Plain of the Dark Sea). The area, bordered to the northeast by Cuailgne (the Cooley peninsula) and to the south by the Ciannachta, was ruled by a Cruthin kingdom known as Conaille Muirtheimne (who were aligned to the Ulaid) in the early Christian period. According to the annals, a battle was fought at Faughart in 732 by Áed Allán, High King of Ireland against the Ulaid, for which there is no contemporary evidence.

The Annals of Ulster record that in 851, Danish Vikings (the Dubhgall) attempted to attack the Norwegian Viking (Fingall) settlement at Annagassan at the southern end of Dundalk Bay and were heavily defeated. The following year, Norwegian Vikings based in Scotland were sent to attack the Danes in Carlingford Lough but their expedition was unsuccessful. D'Alton's History of Dundalk recounts an apocryphal tale of the "Battle of Dundalk": Sitric, son of Turgesius, ruler of the Danes in Ireland, had offered Callaghan, the King of Munster, his sister in marriage. But it was a trick to take the king prisoner and he was captured and held hostage in Armagh. An army was raised in Munster and marched on Armagh to free the king, but he had been removed to Sitric's ship in Dundalk Bay. However, a fleet from Munster attacked the Danes in the bay from the south. During the sea battle, the Munster admiral, Failbhe Fion, boarded Sitric's ship and freed the king, but was killed by Sitric who put Failbhe Fion's head on a pole. Failbhe Fion's second in command, Fingal, enraged, seized Sitric by the neck and jumped into the sea where they both drowned. Two more Irish captains, seeing this, each grabbed one of Sitric's two brothers and did the same, and the Danes subsequently surrendered.

Prior to the arrival of the Normans, the district can be said to have entirely comprised rural settlements, although there are historical references to a pre-Norman town called Traghbaile (anglicised as Traghbally: Seatown), the name of which could originate from the legend of the death of Baile Mac Buain—hence Traghbaile, meaning 'Baile's Strand'.

By the time of the Norman invasion of Ireland in 1169, Magh Muirthemne had been absorbed into the kingdom of Airgíalla (Oriel) under the Ó Cearbhaills. In about 1185, the Norman nobleman Bertram de Verdun erected a manor house at Castletown Mount on the ancient site of Dún Dealgan (Dún being the Irish language term for a type of medieval fort and Dealga being the name of a mythical Fir Bolg Chieftain. De Verdon founded his settlement seemingly without resistance from Airgíalla (the Ó Cearbhaills are recorded as having submitted to Henry II), and in 1187 he founded an Augustinian friary under the patronage of St Leonard. He was awarded the lands around what is now Dundalk by Prince John on the death of Murchadh Ó Cearbhaill in 1189. On de Verdun's death in Jaffa in 1192, his lands at Dundalk passed to his son Thomas and then to his second son, Nicholas, when Thomas died. In 1236, Nicholas's daughter Roesia commissioned Castle Roche 10 km north-west of the present-day town, on a large rocky outcrop with a commanding view of the surrounding countryside. It was completed by her son, John, in the 1260s.

The Ulster Irish sided with Edward Bruce, brother of the Scottish king Robert the Bruce after he landed at Larne on 26 May 1315. As his army made its way south through Ulster, they destroyed the de Verdun fortress at Castle Roche and attacked Dundalk on 29 June. The town was almost totally destroyed and its population, both Anglo-Irish and Gaelic, massacred. After taking possession of the town, Bruce proclaimed himself King of Ireland. Following three more years of battles across the north-eastern part of the island, Bruce was killed and his army defeated at the Battle of Faughart by a force led by John de Birmingham, who was created the 1st Earl of Louth as a reward.

Later generations of de Verduns continued to own lands at Dundalk into the 14th century. Following the death of Theobald de Verdun, 2nd Baron Verdun in 1316 without a male heir, the family's landholdings were split. One of Theobold de Verdun's daughters, Joan, married the second Baron Furnivall, Thomas de Furnivall, and his family subsequently acquired much of the de Verdun land at Dundalk. The de Furnivall family's coat of arms formed the basis of the seal of the 'New Town of Dundalk'—a 14th-century seal discovered in the early 20th century, which became the town's coat of arms in 1968. The 'new town' that was established in the 13th century is the present-day town centre; the 'old town of the Castle of Dundalk' being the original de Verdun settlement at Castletown Mount some 2 km to the west. The de Furnivalls then sold their holdings to the Bellew family, another Norman family long established in County Meath. The town was granted its first formal charter as a 'New Town' in the late 14th century under the reign of Richard II of England.

Effectively a frontier town as the northernmost outpost of The Pale, Dundalk continued to grow as the fourteenth and fifteenth centuries progressed. The town was heavily fortified, as it was regularly attacked—with at least 14 separate assaults, sieges or demands for tribute by a resurgent native Irish population recorded between 1300 and 1600 (with more than that number being likely). The O'Neills and O'Donnells of Ulster ransacked the town at least twice and threatened it on at least three other occasions between 1423 and 1444.

English rule

In advance of crowning himself 'King of Ireland' in 1542, Henry VIII extended his policy of Dissolution of the Monasteries to Ireland, and in 1540 the Priory of St Leonard, founded by Bertram de Verdun, was surrendered. During the subsequent Tudor conquest of Ireland, Dundalk remained the northern outpost of English rule. When the conquest was over, it was recorded that the lands and property of Dundalk were in the hands of Sir John Bellew and Sir John Draycot. The town was later used as a base of operations for the English, led by Charles Blount, 8th Baron Mountjoy, for their push into Ulster through the 'Gap of the North' (the Moyry Pass) in 1600, during the Nine Years' War.

Following the Flight of the Earls, the subsequent Plantation of Ulster (and the associated suppression of Catholicism) resulted in the Irish Rebellion of 1641. After only token resistance, Dundalk was occupied by an Ulster Irish Catholic army on 31 October. They subsequently tried and failed to take Drogheda and retreated to Dundalk. The Royal Irish Army, who were led by the Duke of Ormond (and known as Ormondists), in turn, laid siege to Dundalk and overran and plundered the town in March 1642, killing many inhabitants. The Royalists continued to occupy the town, during which time they maintained a truce with the Irish Catholic Confederation who had succeeded the rebels of 1641, as the English Civil War developed. In 1647, the town was occupied by the Northern Parliamentary Army of George Monck, who held it for two years before surrendering it back to the Ormondists. It was quickly retaken by the forces of Oliver Cromwell, who had landed in Ireland in August 1649 and sacked Drogheda. After the massacre in Drogheda, Cromwell wrote to the Ormondist commander in Dundalk warning him that his garrison would suffer the same fate if it did not surrender. The Duke of Ormond ordered the commander to have his men burn the town before his retreat but they did not do so, such was their haste to leave. For the remainder of the Cromwellian conquest of Ireland, the town was again used as a base for operations against the Irish in Ulster.

The Corporation of Dundalk was granted a new charter by Charles II on 4 March 1673, after the Restoration of the monarchy. The forfeiture of property and settlements carried out during the Restoration saw much of the land of Dundalk granted to Marcus Trevor, 1st Viscount Dungannon, who had fought for both sides in the war. Even though the Bellews were seen as Papists, Sir John Bellew appears to have held on to much of his family's land. English politics were soon impacting Ireland again, and in 1689 the Williamite commander, Schomberg landed in Belfast and marched unopposed to Dundalk, but, as the bulk of his forces were raw and undisciplined as well as inferior in numbers to the Jacobite Irish Army, he decided against risking a battle. He entrenched himself at Dundalk and declined to be drawn beyond the circle of his defences. With poor logistics and struck by disease, over 5,000 of his troops died and an opportunity to end the war by taking Dundalk from the Jacobites was missed.

After the end of the Williamite War, the third Viscount Dungannon, Mark Trevor, sold the Dundalk estate to James Hamilton of Tollymore, County Down. Hamilton's son, also James, was created Viscount Limerick in 1719 and then the first Earl of Clanbrassil in 1756. The modern town of Dundalk largely owes its form to Hamilton. The military activity of the 17th century had left much of the town's walls in ruins. With the collapse of the Gaelic aristocracy and the total takeover of the country by the English, Dundalk was no longer a frontier town and no longer had a need for its 15th-century fortifications. Hamilton commissioned the construction of streets leading to the town centre; his ideas stemming from his visits to Continental Europe. In addition to the demolition of the old walls and castles, he had new roads laid out eastwards of the principal streets.

When the first Earl died in 1758, the estates passed to his son, again James, the second Earl of Clanbrassil, who died without an heir in 1798. The second Earl's sister, Lady Anne Hamilton, had married Robert Jocelyn in 1752. The Jocelyns were originally landowners in County Tipperary and Robert Jocelyn was created first Earl of Roden in 1771. On the death of the second Earl of Clanbrassil, the Earls of Roden succeeded to the Dundalk estate. Several portions of the Roden Dundalk estate were sold off under the auspices of the various land acts of the nineteenth and early twentieth centuries, culminating in the Irish Free State government lands purchase acts of the 1920s. The residue of the estate, mainly freeholds and ground rents, was sold in 2006, thus finally severing the links between the Earls of Roden and the town of Dundalk.

During the 18th century, Ireland was controlled by the minority Anglican Protestant Ascendancy via the Penal Laws, which discriminated against both the majority Irish Catholic population and Dissenters. Mirroring other boroughs around the country, Dundalk Corporation was a 'closed shop', consisting of an electorate of 'freemen', most of whom were absentee landlords of the Ascendancy. The Earl of Clanbrassil controlled the procedures for both the nomination of new freemen and the nomination of parliamentary candidates, therefore disenfranchising the local populace. In the late 18th century, the United Irishmen movement, inspired by the American and French revolutions, led to the Rebellion of 1798. In north Louth, the authorities had successfully suppressed the activities of the United Irishmen prior to the rebellion with the help of informants, and several local leaders had been rounded up and imprisoned in Dundalk Gaol. An attack on the military barracks and gaol was planned for 21 June 1798, in order to free prisoners. The attack failed because of a thunderstorm, which dispersed the gathered United Irish volunteers, and two of the jailed leaders - Anthony Marmion and John Hoey - were subsequently tried for treason and hanged.

After the Acts of Union

Following the Act of Union, which came into force on 1 January 1801, The 19th century saw industrial expansion in the town (see Economy) and the construction of  several buildings that are landmarks in the town. The first railway links arrived when the Dundalk and Enniskillen Railway opened a line from Quay Street to Castleblayney in 1849, and by 1860 the company operated a route northwest to Derry. Also in 1849, the Dublin and Belfast Junction Railway opened Dundalk railway station. Following a series of mergers, both lines were incorporated into the Great Northern Railway (Ireland) in 1876.

The established and merchant classes prospered alongside a general population that suffered from poverty. A typhus epidemic struck in the 1810s, potato-crop failures in the 1820s caused famine, and a cholera epidemic struck in the 1830s. During the Great Famine of the 1840s, the town did not suffer to the same extent as the west and south of Ireland. Cereal-based agriculture, new industries, construction projects, and the arrival of the railway all contributed to sparing the town of its worst effects. Nevertheless, so many people died in the Dundalk Union Workhouse that the graveyard was quickly filled. A second graveyard was opened on the Ardee Road—the Dundalk Famine Graveyard—which is known to contain approximately 4,000 bodies. It was closed in 1905 and was left derelict until the 21st century when local volunteers worked to restore it.

In 1858, a ship, the Mary Stoddart, was wrecked in Dundalk Bay during a storm. In attempting to rescue the crew, Captain James Joseph Kelly and three volunteer crew drowned when the storm overturned their boat. Five of the Mary Stoddart crew were also lost, while 11 were eventually rescued. The Kelly Monument in Roden Place was erected 20 years later as a memorial.

The latter part of the 19th century was dominated by the Irish Home Rule movement and Dundalk became a focal point of the politics of the time. The Irish National Land League held a demonstration in Dundalk on New Year's Day, 1881, stated by the local press to be the largest gathering ever seen in the town. The town by this point had become increasingly and overtly nationalistic—for example, the Dundalk Democrat & People's Journal newspaper, founded in 1849, had the motto "Ireland for the Irish" on its masthead, and the 'Maid of Erin' monument was erected in the Market Square outside the courthouse to commemorate the centenary of the 1798 rebellion.

As the Home Rule movement developed, the sitting Home Rule League MP, Philip Callan, fell afoul of party leader Charles Stewart Parnell, who travelled to Dundalk to oversee efforts to have Callan unseated. Parnell's candidate, Joseph Nolan, defeated Callan in the election of 1885, after a campaign of voter suppression and intimidation on both sides. Following the split in the Irish Parliamentary Party, the leading anti-Parnellite, Tim Healy, won the North Louth seat in 1892, defeating Nolan (who had stayed loyal to Parnell). The campaign, predicted by Healy to be "the nastiest fight in Ireland", saw running battles and mass brawls in the streets between Parnellites, 'Healyites', and 'Callanites'—supporters of Philip Callan, who was trying to regain his seat.

The local Sinn Féin cumann was founded in 1907 by Patrick Hughes. It struggled to grow beyond a handful of members owing to the existing political factions. In 1910, on the accession of George V to the English throne, the local High Sheriff, accompanied by police and soldiers, led a proclamation to the new king at the Market Square. The ceremony was interrupted by the local Sinn Féin members, who raised a tricolour beside the Maid of Erin monument and chanted "God Save Ireland" during a rendition of "God Save the King"—giving the party visibility in the town for the first time.

Approximately 2,500 men from Louth volunteered for Allied regiments in World War I and it is estimated that 307 men from the Dundalk district died during the war. In the months before the outbreak of the war, the G.N.R. converted nine of its carriages into a mobile 'ambulance train', which could hold 100 wounded soldiers. Ambulance Train 13 was kept in service for the duration of the war before being decommissioned in 1919. The war came to Dundalk right at its end, when the S.S. Dundalk was sunk by a German U-Boat on 14 October 1918 on a voyage from Liverpool back to Dundalk. 20 crew-members were killed, while 12 were rescued.

Meanwhile, the Easter Rising had changed the political landscape. 80 members of the Irish Volunteers had left Dundalk to take part in the Rising, with orders to destroy the bridge at Slane and take up position in Blanchardstown, outside Dublin. The countermanding order of Eoin MacNeill, followed by the realisation that the Rising had commenced anyway, caused confusion. Members of the unit ended up in Castlebellingham, trying to evade the Dundalk RIC. There, they held several RIC men and a British Army officer at gunpoint until one of the Volunteers, believing the army officer was reaching for a hidden weapon, fired, killing RIC constable Charles McGee. The unit subsequently made their way to North County Dublin until the Rising had ended. They went on the run and most were captured. Four were sentenced to death for the murder of Constable McGee but were released in the general amnesty of 1917.

Independence
In the 1918 Irish general election, Louth elected its first Sinn Féin MP when John J. O'Kelly defeated the sitting MP, Richard Hazleton of the Irish Parliamentary Party, in the closest contest of the election—O'Kelly winning by 255 votes. In the run-up to the election, the local newspapers had supported the Irish Party over Sinn Féin and complained afterwards that the area of Drogheda in County Meath that was included in the Louth constituency had tipped the contest in Sinn Féin's favour. Again, the campaign saw reports of widespread violence and intimidation tactics.

There was no strategic military action in north Louth during the Irish War of Independence. Activity consisted of attacks on RIC stations and patrols to seize arms, and acts of sabotage. Arson attacks were a feature of the period in particular. Crown forces committed reprisal attacks in response, hardening support for Sinn Féin. In the aftermath of a shooting of an RIC auxiliary on 17 June 1921, brothers John and Patrick Watters were taken from their home at the Windmill Bar and shot dead. The British authorities subsequently suppressed the Dundalk Examiner newspaper for reporting on the incident, and smashed its printing presses. Volunteers from the area led by Frank Aiken were more active in Ulster, and were responsible for the derailing of a military train at Adavoyle railway station, 14 km north of Dundalk, which killed three soldiers, the train's guard, and dozens of horses.

The Anglo-Irish Treaty turned Dundalk, once again, into a frontier town. Aiken's Fourth Northern Division continued a guerrilla campaign against the new Northern Ireland government and its Ulster Special Constabulary, with sectarian attacks and reprisals carried out by both sides. In the new Irish Free State, the split over the treaty led to the Irish Civil War. Before the outbreak of hostilities, Éamon de Valera toured Ireland making a series of anti-treaty speeches. In the Market Square on 2 April 1922, before a large crowd, he said that those who had negotiated the treaty "had run across to Lloyd George to be spanked like little boys." Aiken attempted to keep his division neutral during the split over the treaty but events in Dublin overtook his border war.

On 16 July 1922, Aiken and all of the anti-treaty elements among his men were arrested and imprisoned at Dundalk military barracks and Dundalk Gaol in a surprise move by the pro-treaty Fifth Northern Division, now part of the National Army. Eleven days later, anti-treaty 'Irregulars' blew a hole in the outer wall of the gaol, freeing Aiken and his men. At 4am on 14 August, Aiken led an attack on the barracks that resulted in its capture with five National Army and two Irregular soldiers killed. Aiken's men killed another dozen National Army soldiers in guerrilla attacks before the town was retaken without resistance on 26 August. Before withdrawing, Aiken called for a truce at a meeting in the centre of Dundalk. From that point, north Louth ceased to be an area of strategic importance in the war. Guerrilla attacks continued—mainly acts of sabotage, particularly against the railway. In January 1923, six anti-treaty prisoners were executed by firing squad in Dundalk for bearing arms against the state.

Border town
The partition of Ireland turned Dundalk into a border town and the Dublin–Belfast main line into an international railway. On 1 April 1923, the Free State government began installing border posts for the purpose of collecting customs duties. Almost immediately, the town started to suffer economic problems. A global post-war slump had been exacerbated by the introduction of the border and tariffs. Businesses in the town saw their trade with the new cross-border areas greatly reduced, and Carroll's tobacco company set about opening a new factory in Liverpool. The Dundalk Distillery was closed within weeks, as its products became nonviable. It reopened temporarily but was closed again in 1926 because its owners, Scottish Distillers, no longer needed the production capacity. The same year, the G.N.R. works reduced its workforce by several hundred; and the Dundalk and Newry Steam Packet Company went into voluntary liquidation and was taken over by B&I. It had been beset by strikes because of wage cuts imposed in both Dundalk and Liverpool by management. With a population of 14,000 at the time, unemployment was reported to be nearly 2,000 and it was reported that: "Up to a few years ago, Dundalk was one of the most prosperous and go-ahead towns in Ireland... [but] it is a matter of common local knowledge that distress to an acute degree is prevalent." The Anglo-Irish trade war, in the midst of a global depression, made things more difficult still. The industrial situation stabilised, however, as the need for self-sufficiency and the protectionist policies adopted allowed local industries to increase employment and prosper.

After the election of Fianna Fáil in 1932, two years of violence and intimidation followed as former Civil War foes in the IRA and National Army clashed at political rallies. The latter formed the Army Comrades Association, and became known as the Blueshirts. A member of the Blueshirts carrying money from a collection in Dundalk was robbed at gunpoint by the IRA. Two local men were subsequently convicted of the robbery. One of the witnesses for the prosecution was a Joseph McGrory from Chapel Sreet. Unidentified men, presumed by Gardaí to be members of the IRA, later threw a bomb into his house, destroying it and seriously injuring his mother who was inside, and two children playing outside. The woman later died from her injuries. Five suspects charged with her murder were later acquitted due to lack of evidence. One of these, IRA Volunteer Richard Goss, was interned at the start of World War II and was released following a successful habeas corpus legal challenge. He was later executed in 1941 for shooting at Gardaí and Defence Forces while trying to evade arrest.

There were three aeroplane crashes in what is now the municipal district during the war. A British Hudson bomber crashed with three fatalities in 1941, and a P-51 Mustang fighter of the US Army Air Forces crashed in September 1944, killing its pilot. The worst of the wartime air crashes occurred on 16 March 1942. 15 allied airmen died when their Consolidated B-24 Liberator bomber crashed into Slieve na Glogh, which rises above the townland of Jenkinstown. On 24 July 1941, the Luftwaffe dropped bombs near the town. There were no casualties and only minor damage was caused.

The town continued to grow in size—in terms of area, population and employment—after "the Emergency" (as World War II was called in Ireland), despite economic shocks such as the dissolution of the G.N.R. in 1958 and the closure of the Rawson shoe factory after a fire in 1967. The accession of Ireland to the European Economic Community in 1973 caused difficulties, however. Subsequent factory closures and job losses in businesses that struggled due to competition, collapsing consumer confidence, and unfavourable exchange rates with cross-border competitors, resulted in an unemployment rate of 26% by 1986.

In addition, the outbreak of the Troubles in Northern Ireland in 1968 and the town's position close to the border saw the town's population swell, as nationalists/Catholics fleeing the violence in Northern Ireland settled in the area. As a result of the ongoing sectarianism in the north, there was sympathy for the cause of the Provisional Irish Republican Army and Sinn Féin, and the town was home to numerous IRA operatives. It was in this period that Dundalk earned the nickname 'El Paso', after the Texan border town of the same name on the border with Mexico. On 1 September 1973, the 27 Infantry Battalion of the Irish Army was established, with its headquarters in Dundalk barracks, as a result of the ongoing violence in the border region of North Louth / South Armagh. The barracks was renamed Aiken Barracks in 1986 in honour of Frank Aiken.

'The Battle of Courtbane' took place on Sunday 29 August 1971, when a British army patrol consisting of two armoured Ferret Scout cars crossed the Irish border into Co. Louth near the village of Courtbane close to Dundalk. Angry locals blocked their retreat and set one of the vehicles on fire. As this was happening, an IRA unit arrived on the scene and a British soldier was killed and another wounded after an exchange of gunfire. The Ulster Volunteer Force carried out the 'Christmas Bombing' on 19 December 1975, when a car bomb killed two people and injured 15. The town was also the scene of several killings connected to the INLA and its propensity to engage in internal feuds and criminal activity.

After the start of the Northern Ireland peace process, and the subsequent Good Friday Agreement, then U.S. president, Bill Clinton chose Dundalk to make an open-air address in December 2000 in support of the peace process. In his speech in the Market Square, witnessed by an estimated 60,000 people, Clinton spoke of "a new day in Dundalk and a new day in Ireland".

21st century

The town was slow to benefit from a 'peace dividend', and in the first decade of the new millennium the remaining shoe factory, the two Diageo-owned breweries, and the Carroll's tobacco factory were among several factories to close—finally severing the links to the town's industrial past. By 2012, the town was being painted as one of Ireland's "most deprived areas" after the global downturn following the Financial crisis of 2007–2008.

Indigenous industry started to recover, with the Great Northern Brewery being reopened as 'the Great Northern Distillery' in 2015 by John Teeling, who had established and later sold the Cooley Distillery; and locally-driven initiatives led to a flurry of foreign direct investment announcements in the latter half of the 2010s, particularly in the technology and pharmaceutical sectors.

The town's association football club, Dundalk F.C., first formed in 1903 by the workers of the Great Northern Railway, received European-wide recognition when it became the first Irish side to win points in the group stage of European competition in the 2016–17 UEFA Europa League. The club again qualified for the group stage in the 2020–21 season.

Geography
Dundalk lies on the 54th parallel north circle of latitude. It is situated where the Castletown River flows into Dundalk Bay on the east coast of Ireland, with the town centre on the south side of the river. It is in County Louth, which shares borders with County Armagh to the north (in Northern Ireland), County Monaghan to the west, and County Meath to the south. The town came to be nicknamed the 'Gap of the North' where the northernmost point of the province of Leinster meets the province of Ulster, although the actual 'gap' is the Moyry Pass 8 km to the north at the border with Northern Ireland. Following the abolition of 'legal towns' under the Local Government Reform Act 2014, Dundalk is part of the wider Dundalk Municipal District for the purposes of local government, which is approximately equivalent to the pre-1898 baronies of Dundalk Lower and Dundalk Upper, i.e. roughly the northern one-third of the county by area including the Cooley peninsula. The former legal town and its environs (approximately the area north of the River Fane (including Blackrock), south of Exit 18 on the M1, bordered by the M1 to the west and the Irish Sea to the east; and incorporating Knockbridge to the west of the M1) is now the 'census town'.

Landscape

The main part of the census town lies at sea level.

The urban area straddles two geographical areas. A landscape of drumlins and undulating farmland form a crescent around the town's outer limits. This area contains contorted Ordovician and Silurian slates and shales. The flat, low-lying coastal plain of the main part of the urban area consists of alluvial clays, laid down as the sea retreated following the last Ice Age. The subsequent land reclamation was both a natural process and a man-made one—in particular as a result of the drainage schemes undertaken in the eighteenth century by James Hamilton, the first Earl of Clanbrassil. This has meant that the topography of the district has changed extensively since the area was first inhabited and also since the formation of the original Norman settlements.

Street layout

The layout of Dundalk is based around three principal street systems leading to the open, central Market Square. Running north from the square to the bridge over the Castletown River is Clanbrassil Street and Bridge Street; with the Castletown Road running west from Bridge Street towards Castletown Mount—the original Norman settlement of Dundalk. Running east from the square towards the old Quay Street railway station, the army barracks and the Port of Dundalk is Jocelyn Street, Seatown Place and Barrack Street. Running south out of the town to the Dublin Road is Park Street, Dublin Street, and Hill Street.

Climate
Similar to much of northwest Europe, Dundalk experiences an oceanic climate and does not suffer from the extremes of temperature experienced by many other locations at similar latitude. Summers are typically cool and partly cloudy and the winter is typically cold, wet, windy, and mostly cloudy.

Demography
Dundalk is the eighth largest urban area in Ireland and the third largest town (behind Drogheda and Swords), with a population of 39,004 as of the 2016 census. Dundalk is the biggest town in Louth, however, because approximately 15% of the population of Drogheda is in County Meath.

Population statistics

Population by place of birth

Population by ethnic or cultural background

Population by religion

Population by principal economic status

Language
The first language of the majority of 'white Irish' residents of Dundalk is English (a.k.a. Hiberno-English). Approximately 4% of the population speak the Irish language on a daily basis outside of the education system. The Omeath area in Cooley, within the municipal district, was a small Gaeltacht area, with the last speaker of a 'Louth Irish' dialect dying in 1960.

Politics and government

National and European
Dundalk is the county town (the administrative centre) of the county of Louth in Ireland. It is represented at the national level in Dáil Éireann as part the Louth parliamentary constituency, which was created under the terms of the Electoral Act 1923, and first used at the 1923 general election.

Prior to the Act of Union, which came into force on 1 January 1801, Dundalk was a Parliament of Ireland constituency. Following the Act of Union, Dundalk was a UK Parliament constituency until 1885. In 1885, the constituency was combined with the northern part of the County Louth constituency to become North Louth. In 1918, the North Louth constituency was combined with South Louth to form a single County Louth constituency for the whole county—the precursor of the constituency formed following the creation of Dáil Éireann.

Dundalk is represented in the European Parliament within the Midlands–North-West constituency.

Local government
Louth County Council is the authority responsible for local government in Dundalk. As a county council, it is governed by the Local Government Act 2001. For administrative purposes, the council is sub-divided into three areas, centred around the three main towns in the county—Dundalk, Drogheda and Ardee. The Dundalk Municipal District comprises all of the county to the north of a line running approximately east-to-north west, from the coast to the Monaghan border, across the villages of Castlebellingham and Knockbridge.

The county council has 29 elected members, 13 of whom are from the Dundalk region. Elections are held every five years and are by single transferable vote. For the purpose of elections, the Dundalk Municipal District is sub-divided into two local electoral areas: Dundalk-Carlingford (6 Seats) and Dundalk South (7 Seats).

Coat of arms

The coat of arms of Dundalk was officially granted by the Office of the Chief Herald at the National Library of Ireland in 1968, and is a replication of the seal matrix of the 'New Town of Dundalk', which itself dates to the 14th century. The seal is based on the coat of arms of the de Furnivall family. Thomas de Furnivall had obtained a large part of the land and property of Dundalk and district in about 1309 by marriage to Joan de Verdun, the daughter of Theobald de Verdun (2nd Baron Verdun) and Matilda Mortimer. A bend between six martlets forms the shield. The ermine boar supporter is derived from the arms of the Ó hAnluain (O'Hanlon) family, Kings of Airthir, the main Gaelic Irish family in the area. The exact origins of the lion passant guardant and the foot soldier with his spear and sword are not known. The lion is represented in the style of those on the Royal Arms adopted by Richard I of England. It has been said that it comes from the Mortimer family, but a lion is not incorporated in the Mortimer family arms. The soldier is presumably related to the town's origins as a Norman stronghold.

Previously, the town's coat of arms was a simpler three gold martlets on an azure field. The earliest recorded use of this coat of arms is when the Corporation of Dundalk was granted a charter by Charles II in 1673. It appears as the Corporation Seal in a town plan dated 1675. It cannot be stated definitively if there is a link between the 14th century seal and the 17th century seal. However, another Anglo-Norman family, the Dowdalls, were also influential landowners in Dundalk in the Middle Ages, having moved to Louth in the 13th century, and their family coat of arms contains three martlets on a field. The townland of Dowdallshill lies to the north of the Castletown River. The Corporation Seal can be seen carved in stone on the Town Hall, which was built in the mid-1800s.

In December 1929, the town council proposed to remove the "three black crows" seal because it had supposedly been imposed by King Henry VIII, a historically inaccurate claim that met widespread derision. The majority on the town council pressed ahead and the old seal was replaced by a seal depicting Saint Patrick, Saint Brigid and Saint Colmcille in the form of a shamrock.

The shield with three martlets continued to be used as the logo of several companies and organisations in the town. Examples include the Dundalk Race Company Limited (the company that ran Dundalk Racecourse), the Macardle Moore and Company brewery, and Dealgan Milk Products (a dairy company formed in the town in 1960). It also became the crest of Dundalk Football Club in 1927. The club's current crest retains the three martlets but on a red shield.

Economy

Industry

Linen was the first industry established in Dundalk in the mid 18th century, but the cambric and damask businesses had failed by the end of the century, with the factories becoming derelict. It would be the next century before new industries established themselves: mills, tanneries, a foundry, a distillery, and breweries. During James Hamilton's improvements to the town during the 18th century, the Port of Dundalk was established and became the eighth largest in Ireland in terms of exports.

The latter half of the nineteenth century saw the population of Dundalk increase by 30% (despite the population of Ireland as a whole dropping in the same period) as the town's industries thrived prior to the partition of Ireland. The Malcolm Brown & Co. Dundalk Distillery was established c.1780 at Roden Place and operated successfully throughout the 19th century. Brewing was also a key industry in the town, with eight breweries in operation by the end of the 1830s. The famine of the 1840s left just two breweries in operation, which merged to become the Macardle Moore & Co. brewery at Cambricville. The Great Northern Brewery opened later, in 1896. The Dundalk Iron Works was established in 1821 and by the end of the century had expanded to become a leading employer in the town under the ownership of A.E. Manisty. The P.J. Carroll tobacco factory, started on a small scale in the 1820s, grew throughout the 19th and early 20th centuries. The Great Northern Railway (Ireland) works established in 1881 became the "backbone of the town".

The town's industries suffered after partition and again from the Anglo-Irish trade war. The imposition of tariffs and duties in April 1923 and the establishment of customs checks on the border affected exports and trade with the Newry district, which was now in a different jurisdiction. The distillery, which the Distillers Company of Scotland had acquired in 1912, was the first major Dundalk industry to close. It reopened temporarily, before it was closed permanently in 1926. The Dundalk Iron Works, also known as A.E. Manisty & Co., went into liquidation in 1928. Protectionism gave the town's industries breathing space, and by 1950 they had recovered from the effects of partition and the trade war. The two breweries were successful, the Dundalk Linen Company was expanding for the first time in decades, and there were 1,800 people working in shoe manufacturing in three factories—Rawson's, Halliday's and Connolly's. 2,000 jobs were by this point dependant on the railway works and 500 jobs were dependent on the Carroll's tobacco factory. The town was also a thriving commercial centre, as the increase in bus traffic brought shoppers in from a wide radius.

This was a peak period, however. The Northern Ireland government's decision to close many of the G.N.R. lines north of the border made the company nonviable, and it was dissolved in 1958. With it went the works in Dundalk. It was replaced by Dundalk Engineering Works Ltd (DEW)—a government-backed initiative to keep the 980 remaining workers in employment. Against that backdrop, Clarks, who had formed a partnership with Halliday's and would take full control of the company in 1971, demanded in 1959 that the town's Athletic Grounds be sold to them for a new factory, or they would pull out of the town altogether. Afraid of the potential loss of 900 jobs, the council agreed to the sale, over considerable opposition. Carroll's also continued to expand and modernise, opening a new factory on the Dublin Road in 1970, which was designed by Ronnie Tallon of Michael Scott & Partners, which subsequently won architectural awards for its design.

As late as 1969, the town was still in a position to boast of its industrial prowess, with the engineering companies at the DEW prospering. The pressures of trade liberalisation introduced by Ireland's accession to the EEC in 1973 caused many of them to falter during the 1970s and 1980s. The most at-risk industry proved to be shoe manufacturing. Rawson's had already gone into liquidation in 1967 after the factory was destroyed by fire, with the loss of 500 jobs. Lower-cost imports made the Clark's factory unprofitable and after years of cutbacks it closed in 1985 with the loss of the remaining 370 jobs. Also closing permanently in 1985 was the Weyenberg Shoe Company factory, which had opened in 1969 and hired many ex-Rawson workers but had never reached full productivity. Only the smallest of the manufacturers—Connolly's, re-branded as Blackthorn—managed to stay in business by specialising its products. It eventually closed in 2001. 1985 proved to be the nadir, also seeing the closure of the Engineering Works. By this stage unemployment in the town had reached 26%, and would reach 27.9% by 1991. Pleas to government for assistance were unsuccessful.

The town was slow to benefit from the Celtic Tiger economy that saw an economic boom in Ireland from the mid-1990s and seemed to stagnate with more closures and job losses. In addition to the surviving breweries and Carroll's, the ECCO (Electronics Components Company Overseas) factory opened by General Electric in 1966 had become the town's leading employer in the 1970s, employing around 1,500 people at its peak with many thousands more working in companies providing goods and services to it. It, too, succumbed to competition and following a long period of decline, closed in 2006. Diageo decided to close both of the town's breweries—Cambricville in 2001, then the Great Northern in 2013 after a decade-long wind down. Also after a long decline, the Carroll's factory closed in 2005. By 2012, the town was being painted as one of Ireland's "most deprived areas" after the global downturn following the Financial crisis of 2007–2008. Indigenous industry started to recover, with the Great Northern Brewery being reopened as 'the Great Northern Distillery' in 2015 by John Teeling, who had established the Cooley Distillery. Locally-driven initiatives led to a flurry of Foreign Direct Investment announcements in the latter half of the 2010s, particularly in the technology and pharmaceutical sectors.

Tourism
Historically, the border region has not seen the same level of tourism as Dublin or the Atlantic coast regions of Ireland, which was primarily the result of the Troubles and an associated lack of marketing. This began to change in the mid-1990s because of the start of the Northern Ireland peace process, and the increase in government investment in tourism made possible by the 'Celtic Tiger' period of economic expansion. The area has since seen a growth in visitor numbers, with 172,000 foreign and 179,000 domestic visitors to Louth recorded in 2017.

The Dundalk / North Louth region is marketed as part of the 'Ireland's Ancient East' campaign. The 'ancient east' encompasses Ireland's coast from the border with Northern Ireland at Carlingford Lough to Kinsale in County Cork; inland as far as the River Shannon. In contrast to the Wild Atlantic Way, which focuses on landscape, the 'Ireland's Ancient East' campaign is more focused on history and heritage. Louth is marketed as the 'Land of Legends', a campaign which also refers to a "rich and ancient history and heritage" and seeks to increase the number of visitors to the region "by capitalising on Co Louth's unique location within Ireland's Ancient East, as the hub for the Boyne Valley and the Cooley, Mourne and Gullion Regions".

Transport

Shipping
Dundalk Port is a cargo import and export facility. There is no passenger traffic.

Shipping services to Liverpool were provided from 1837 by the Dundalk Steam Packet Company. It took over its rivals to become the Dundalk and Newry Steam Packet Company, which shipped cargo, live animals and passengers. It was forced to go into liquidation and allow itself to be taken over by B&I in 1926 following a series of strikes. B&I maintained the Dundalk to Liverpool route as a weekly service until 1968.

Railway

Dundalk is the first station on the southern side of the border along the Belfast–Dublin line. The first railway links arrived when the Dundalk and Enniskillen Railway opened a line from Quay Street to Castleblayney in 1849, and by 1860 the company operated a route northwest to Derry. The line to Quay Street was extended to Newry and Greenore by the Dundalk, Newry and Greenore Railway, owned by the London and North Western Railway, who operated a hotel in Greenore and from where a ferry service operated to Holyhead. It was opened between Greenore and Dundalk in 1873, and extended to Newry in 1876.

Also in 1849, the Dublin and Belfast Junction Railway opened its first station in Dundalk. Following a series of mergers, both the Dublin and Belfast and Dundalk and Enniskillen lines were incorporated into the Great Northern Railway (Ireland) in 1876. After partition, the G.N.R. had a border running through its network, with lines crisscrossing it several times, and the Northern Ireland government wanted to close many of the lines in favour of bus transport. By the 1950s, the G.N.R. company had ceased to be profitable and Dundalk saw its secondary routes closed—first the line to Greenore and Newry in 1951, and then the line to Derry in 1957. The G.N.R. was nationalised on both sides of the border in 1953, and the company was finally dissolved in 1958. The closure of the G.N.R. left Dundalk with only one operational line—the Dublin–Belfast "Enterprise" service (as well as Commuter services to and from Dublin).

The G.N.R. built the current Dundalk railway station in 1894. It was renamed Clarke Station in 1966, in commemoration of Tom Clarke, one of the executed leaders of the Easter Rising of 1916. It houses a small museum in the old first-class waiting room, and has been called, "the finest station on the main Dublin–Belfast line". It was used as a filming location for the Walt Disney Pictures film, Disenchanted in May 2021.

Bus
Dundalk's Bus Station is operated by Bus Éireann and is located on the Long Walk near the town centre. The company runs a town service—Route 174. The company also operates routes from Dundalk to Dublin, Galway, Newry, Clones, Cavan, and towns in between.

The Dundalk-Blackrock route was one of very few bus routes not compulsorily purchased by CIÉ under the Transport Acts of 1932 and 1933. It has been operated by Halpenny Travel since 1920.

Road
The M1–N1/A1 connects Dundalk to Dublin and Belfast. Exits 16, 17, and 18 service Dundalk South, Dundalk Centre and Dundalk North, respectively. The National Secondary Road N52 from Nenagh, County Tipperary travels through the junction for Exit 16 on the M1, runs through the east side of the town, and terminates at the junction for Exit 18 of the M1. The N53 from Castleblayney, County Monaghan, which crosses the border twice, terminates at the junction for Exit 17 on the M1. The R173, which starts and finishes at the junction for Exit 18 of the M1, connects the town to the Cooley peninsula. The R171 connects the town to Ardee, the R177 and A29 connect the town to Armagh, and the R178 connects the town to Virginia, County Cavan via Carrickmacross, Shercock, and Bailieborough.

Architecture

Many of the buildings of architectural note in the town were built during the 19th century. Several buildings on the streets off the Market Square are described as being in the "Dundalk style" —ornate buildings, "testifying to the confidence of Dundalk's merchant class in the latter part of the nineteenth-century".

The Courthouse (completed in 1819) was designed by Edward Parke and John Bowden in the Neoclassical style and modelled on the Temple of Hephaestus in Athens. The Maid of Erin statue, erected in 1898, is located in the Market Square in front of the Court House. The adjacent Town Hall (completed in 1865), is an elaborate Italianate Palazzo Townhall, originally designed by John Murray as a corn exchange. It was sold to the Town Commissioners on completion and now houses An Táin Arts Centre, which comprises a 350-seat main theatre, a 55-seat studio theatre, a visual arts gallery, and two workshop spaces.

The Kelly Monument is located in nearby Roden Place, in front of St Patrick's Church. It was erected in 1879 to commemorate the sinking of the Mary Stoddart in Dundalk Bay in 1858 and those who drowned in attempting a rescue. The Louth County Library is located off Roden Place, in a restored building of what was the Dundalk Distillery. Further up Jocelyn Street, the County Museum Dundalk, documenting the history of County Louth, is housed in another restored building of the former distillery.

Dundalk Gaol was completed in 1855 and closed as a gaol in the 1930s. It was designed by John Neville, who was the county engineer at the time. The Governor's House to the front of the Gaol became the Garda Station, and the two prison wings were later restored and divided between the 'Oriel Centre' and the Louth County Archive. The neighbouring Louth County Infirmary (completed in 1834) was designed by English architect Thomas Smith in a neo-Tudor style with a central entrance-way flanked by two recessed ground floor arcades. It was purchased by Dundalk Grammar School in 2000.

The two oldest buildings in the town centre are Saint Nicholas's Church of Ireland church and Seatown Castle. Saint Nicholas's was originally built c. 1400. It comprises elements of fourteenth- seventeenth- and eighteenth-century church buildings, having been extended, damaged, rebuilt over the centuries, and finally reworked by Francis Johnston. It is known locally as the Green Church due to its green copper spire. It contains an epitaph erected to the memory of Scotland's National Bard, Robert Burns. His sister, Agnes Burns, is buried in the church's graveyard. Seatown Castle is at the junction of Mill Street and Castle Street. It is part of what was a Franciscan friary originally founded in the 13th century. A baptismal font in St. Nicholas's is reputed to have come from the friary.

Further out from the town centre are Dún Dealgan Motte and Castle Roche. The former is also known as Cú Chulainn Castle and Byrne's Folly. It sits on the site of the manor house built in the late 12th century by Bertram de Verdun when the Normans reached the area. The castellated house now located on the site was built in 1780 by a local pirate named Patrick Byrne. It is a National Monument. Castle Roche was built by Bertram's granddaughter, Roesia, and completed by her son, John, in the late 13th century.

A 20th century construction, which has won architectural awards, is the Carroll's tobacco factory on the Dublin Road. It was called "a ground breaking Irish factory design". The design, by Ronnie Tallon, is in the Miesian idiom. The first of the Louis le Brocquy Táin illustrations was commissioned for the factory. It became part of the Dundalk Institute of Technology campus in the 2010s. The 'sails' sculpture to the front was designed by Gerda Frömel.

Many of the churches in the town were also built in the 19th century, including the Presbyterian church (1839), the former Methodist church (1834), and the Roman Catholic churches of St Patrick (1847), St Malachy (1862), St Nicholas (1860), and St Joseph (1890). St Patrick's was designed by Thomas Duff, and modelled on King's College Chapel, Cambridge. It was completed in 1847. Duff also designed the Presbyterian church on Jocelyn Street. The bell tower at St Patrick's was added in 1903, modelled by George Ashlin on that of another English church, Gloucester Cathedral. Ashlin also designed the granite-built St Joseph's Redemptorist monastery and church (finished in 1880 and 1892, respectively).

Public spaces

The largest park in the town centre is Ice House Hill. The site was once part of Dundalk House demesne (the stately home of the Earl of Clanbrassil). Dundalk House itself was demolished in the early 20th century to make way for an extension of the original P.J. Carroll tobacco factory. The original Ice House, built c. 1780, remains in the park and can be viewed from the outside. The bandstand was erected in the early 1920s. Most of the land which the park is on was reclaimed from the Castletown River. St Leonard's Garden in Seatown is a small park restored in the 1960s from a cemetery that was closed in 1896 and allowed to become overgrown. Within the park are the ruined remains of stone walls from the friary founded by Bertram de Verdun in the 12th century.

The Navvy Bank (from 'navigator') is an artificial embankment constructed in the 1840s to facilitate the entry of shipping to Dundalk Port. It is now a public walkway. Along its route, there is a memorial to those who died in the sinking of the S.S. Dundalk during World War I. At Soldiers Point there is a bronze sculpture called The Sea God Managuan and Voyagers after a Celtic god of the sea.

Adjacent to the town of Dundalk is the village of Blackrock ( from the town centre), which has three public beaches. Blackrock was a fishing village before it became popular as a resort destination in the late 19th century. The promenade and sea wall, originally built in 1851, run along the length of the main beach and main street of the village. There are wetlands on both the north and south sides of the village, which are wildlife sanctuaries. In 2000, to mark the millennium year, a sundial / statue was erected in Blackrock on the promenade.

 to the south-west of the town, between Haggardstown and Knockbridge, is Stephenstown Pond—a nature park. It was originally commissioned by Matthew Fortescue, owner of the nearby Stephenstown House, which is in ruins. It was designed by William Galt, husband of Agnes Burns.

 to the north of the town, within the municipal district, is Ravensdale forest. It is mixed woodland rising steeply to the summit of Black Mountain, rising , with many kilometres of forest roads and tracks. There are three way-marked trails in the forest, the Táin Trail, the Ring of Gullion and the shorter Ravensdale Loop. It is managed by the Irish Forestry Service, Coillte.

Education

Primary schools
Primary schools in Dundalk include some Irish language-medium schools (Gaelscoileanna) like Gaelscoil Dhún Dealgan. There are approximately 20 English-medium national schools in the area, the largest of which include Muire na nGael National School (also known as Bay Estate National School) and Saint Joseph's National School, which (as of early 2020) had an enrollment of over 670 and 570 pupils respectively.

Secondary schools
Secondary schools in the town include Coláiste Lú (an Irish medium secondary school or Gaelcholáiste), De la Salle College, Dundalk Grammar School, St. Mary's College (also known as the Marist), O'Fiaich College, Coláiste Rís, St. Vincent's Secondary School, St. Louis Secondary School, and Coláiste Chú Chulainn.

Tertiary education
Dundalk Institute of Technology (abbreviated to DkIT) is the focal point for higher education and research on the Belfast-Dublin corridor, serving the North Leinster, South Ulster region. It was established in 1970 as the Regional Technical College, offering primarily technician and apprenticeship courses.

The Ó Fiaich Institute of Further Education also offers further education courses.

Culture

Music and arts
Dundalk has two centres for the arts—An Táin Arts Centre, an independent arts space in the former Táin Theatre, Town Hall, Crowe Street; and The Oriel Centre in the former Dundalk Gaol, a regional centre for Comhaltas Ceoltóirí Éireann. The Oriel Centre is a resource centre and performance space, and has facilities for teaching, archives, recording, rehearsal, and performance. The Spirit Store, located at George's Quay in the Port of Dundalk, is a gig venue in the town.

Dundalk Institute of Technology Department of Creative Arts, Media and Music has several groups and ensembles, including the Ceol Oirghiallla Traditional Music Ensemble, the DkIT Choir, the Music Theatre Group, the Oriel Traditional Orchestra, and the Fr. McNally Chamber Orchestra.

The Cross Border Orchestra of Ireland (CBOI) is a youth orchestra based at Coláiste Chu Chulainn, Dundalk. It was started as a peace initiative. Since 1996, it has toured internationally and has played at venues such as Carnegie Hall and the Royal Albert Hall.

The Dundalk Brass Band was established in 1976 and comprises 25-30 members who perform a cross-section of big band and brass music.

The town has two photography clubs, Dundalk Photographic Society and the Táin Photographic Club.

Festivals

The Dundalk Show (also known as the Dundalk Agricultural Show and the Co. Louth Agricultural Show) has run since the 19th century at a number of locations. It was originally held at the Dundalk racecourse in Dowdallshill, before moving to the Fair Green, the grounds of St Mary's College, Bellingham Castle, and latterly Bellurgan Park.

In 2019, the town had its inaugural urban art festival, 'Seek Dundalk'. The street murals painted included Edward Bruce, the engineer Peter Rice, and Cú Chulainn.

Other festivals include the Frostival Winter Festival, held at the end of November, and the St. Gerard Majella Annual Novena, an annual religious festival held over nine days in St. Joseph's Redemptorist Church in Dundalk. It runs from 8 to 16 October. A patron takes place on 15 August at Ladywell Shrine, during the Feast of the Assumption. The Knockbridge Vintage Club also run public events during the year.

The Seatown Patron is held annually on the 29th June (the feast day of Saint Peter, who is the patron saint of Seatown). The patron is celebrated by nighttime bonfires, which is a tradition believed to have originated in medieval times. St. Peter's Well is located under the now derelict Dundalk Windmill in Seatown.

The Dundalk Maytime Festival was the town's largest festival and ran for 40 years starting in 1965. It started out as a 'Grape and Grain' festival before later centring around amateur drama. It eventually ceased because of difficulties in securing sponsorship.

Within the wider Dundalk Municipal District, festivals and events include: the Arcadian Field Music and Arts Festival—a three-day boutique festival begun in 2016 on the grounds of Bellurgan Park, the Táin March festival, established in 2011—a walking festival held in June, which seeks to commemorate the legendary Cattle Raid of Cooley (Táin Bó Cúailnge), the All-Ireland Poc Fada Championship held every year since 1960 on Annaverna Mountain on the Cooley Peninsula, and the Brigid of Faughart Festival (held annually in the first week of February). The town of Carlingford also has several festivals and events during the year.

Twin towns

Dundalk is twinned with the following towns:
 Rezé, France (1990).
 Pikeville, Kentucky, United States (2015)

Sport

Dundalk Football Club is a professional association football club. The club competes in the League of Ireland Premier Division, the top tier of Irish football. The club was founded in 1903 as Dundalk G.N.R., the works-team of the Great Northern Railway. They were a junior club until they joined the Leinster Senior League in 1922–23. They were then elected to the Free State League (which later became the League of Ireland) in 1926–27. The club has played at Oriel Park since moving from its original home at the Dundalk Athletic Grounds in 1936.

Gaelic football clubs in the town include Dundalk Gaels GFC, Seán O'Mahony's GFC, Clan na Gael, Na Piarsaigh, Dowdallshill and Dundalk Young Irelands. Young Irelands (representing Louth) contested the first All-Ireland football final in 1888, losing to the Commercials club, representing Limerick.

The two hurling clubs in the town are Knockbridge GAA and Naomh Moninne H.C., who are the leading club in Louth with 22 county titles as of 2020. A founding member of Naomh Moninne, Father Pól Mac Sheáin, introduced the All-Ireland Poc Fada Championship in 1960.

Dundalk R.F.C. is an amateur Irish Rugby football club who compete in Division 1A of the Leinster League. The club first formed in 1877 and became founder members of the Provincial Towns Union, which then merged into what became the Northern Branch of the Irish Rugby Football Union. They moved to their present home ground at Mill Road in 1967.

The Dundalk Racecourse was reopened as Dundalk Stadium in 2007 and now holds both horse racing and greyhound racing meetings. It is Ireland's first all-weather horse racing track. The stadium also hosts the Dundalk International greyhound race.

Golf was first played in Dundalk when a nine-hole course was laid out at Deer Park in 1893. The Dundalk Golf Club was founded in December 1904 at Deer Park, then moved to its present location in Blackrock in 1922. The current layout was designed by Peter Alliss and completed in 1980. The Ballymascanlon Hotel also has a parkland course. Greenore Golf Club (which is within the municipal district) was opened in October 1896 by the London and North Western Railway company, who owned a hotel in Greenore and the Dundalk, Newry and Greenore Railway. The members bought the club when the railway company closed the line and pulled out of Ireland. The modern course layout was designed by Eddie Hackett.

Dundalk has several game angling waters including the Dee, Glyde, Fane, Ballymascanlan and Castletown rivers. All of these rivers flow into the Irish sea at Dundalk Bay. These rivers contain good stocks of wild brown trout as well as salmon and sea trout. There is a Salmon Anglers Association and a Brown Trout Anglers Association. Sea Angling is available in several locations in the wider Municipal District and there is also a Sea Angling Club.

The Dundalk Lawn Tennis and Badminton Club was established in 1913. It is located at the Ramparts in the town centre. The club has nine tennis courts, two Olympic-standard badminton courts and two squash courts.  A Dundalk and District Snooker League has been active since the 1940s. It was re-branded as the Dundalk Snooker League in 2010 and plays in the Commercial Club in the town centre. The amateur boxing club, Dealgan ABC, was founded in 1938. The current Dundalk Cricket Club was established in 2009. They play in Hiney Park, the former Dundalk F.C. training ground.

There are several athletics clubs, including St. Gerards A.C., St. Peter's A.C, Dun Dealgan A.C. and Blackrock A.C., and a triathlon club (Setanta Triathlon Club). Cuchulainn Cycling Club was formed in 1935.

The Louth Mavericks American Football Club is based in Dundalk and was established in 2012. They play in AFI Division 1, train at DKIT, and play their matches at Dundalk Rugby Club.

Media
Dundalk's local newspapers are the Dundalk Democrat (established as the Dundalk Democrat and People's Journal in 1849), The Argus (established as the Drogheda Argus and Leinster Journal in 1835), and the Dundalk Leader, a freely distributed newspaper. Online-only news media include Louth Now.

Older long-established publications no longer in print include the Dundalk Examiner and Louth Advertiser (1880–1960), and The Dundalk Herald (1868–1918).

There are no local or regional television services. In radio, Dundalk is serviced by regional stations LMFM (Louth-Meath FM) on 96.5 FM, and iRadio (NE and Midlands) on 106.2 FM. The local radio station is Dundalk FM, broadcasting on 97.7 FM.

See also
List of people from Dundalk
List of townlands of County Louth
History of Dundalk F.C.
List of abbeys and priories in County Louth
Lord Lieutenant of Louth
High Sheriff of Louth

Footnotes

References
Bibliography

Citations

External links

Dundalk Chamber of Commerce
Dundalk Business Improvement District Scheme

 
County towns in the Republic of Ireland
Port cities and towns in the Republic of Ireland
Railway towns in Ireland
Populated coastal places in the Republic of Ireland
Populated places established in the 12th century